The Russo-American Treaty of 1824 (also known as the Convention of 1824) was signed in St. Petersburg between representatives of Russia and the United States on April 17, 1824, ratified by both nations on January 11, 1825 and went into effect on January 12, 1825. The accord contained six articles. It gave Russian claims on the Pacific Northwest coast of North America south of parallel 54°40′ north (over what Americans had known as the Oregon Country) to the United States.

The Anglo-Russian Treaty of 1825 between Russia and Great Britain then fixed the Russian Tsar's southernmost boundary of Alaska at the line of 54°40′N, the present southern tip of the Alaska Panhandle, but Russian rights to trade in the area south of that Iatitude remained. The Oregon dispute between the United States and Britain over jurisdiction in the region was already underway as a result of the Adams–Onís Treaty between the U.S. and Spain over the latter's former claims north of the 42nd Parallel (today's Oregon-California boundary).

The 1824 treaty was signed by Karl Nesselrode (mentioned in the treaty as "Charles de Nesselrode", Russia's then foreign minister), Henry Middleton representing the U.S., and Pyotr Ivanovich Poletika (mentioned in the document as "Pierre de Poletica") representing the Russian Empire.

See also
List of treaties
Oregon boundary dispute
Alaska Boundary Dispute
Russian colonization of the Americas
Maritime Fur Trade

References

Russian America
Bilateral treaties of the United States
Oregon Country
1825 treaties
Treaties of the Russian Empire
Russian Empire–United States relations
Pre-statehood history of Oregon
1824 treaties
Bilateral treaties of Russia